Edgardo Rafael Marrero (born July 25, 1962) better known as Eddie Marrero, is an American actor, singer, producer, record executive and humanitarian.

Bio

Eddie Marrero was born in Spanish Harlem's "El Barrio" of Puerto Rican heritage. He began his acting career as a young child when his mother at the time worked for Jack L. Warner, founder and Chief Executive Officer of Warner Bros.

Having acted in numerous staged plays and musicals, his first professional acting role came when he was cast opposite Danny Glover and Matt Dillon in the film, The Saint of Ft. Washington. Although Eddie had no speaking lines in the film, director Tim Hunter saw something in him that he decided to feature him prominently with the stars. He has since worked on the film, television, and theater projects, working with the Gregory Hines in his directorial debut White Man's Burden and Kate & Leopold opposite Liev Schreiber. He is most recently noted for his supporting role in Find Me Guilty opposite Vin Diesel and Annabella Sciorra, directed by Sidney Lumet.

Lumet discovered Eddie Marrero during an audition casting him on the spot to guest star in his A&E drama 100 Centre Street. Since then Eddie Marrero has gone on to appear on the Late Show with David Letterman and in the mini-series Miracle's Boys from director Spike Lee for Nickelodeon’s The N. His other TV credits include NBC's Third Watch, and  Law & Order: Criminal Intent as Det. Ozily in the episode “Sex Club”. On stage Eddie Marrero starred in the world premiere Off-Broadway play "La Lupe: My Life My Destiny" along with Puerto Rican soap star, Sully Diaz.

In recent years, Eddie Marrero has shifted his focus to music, releasing his first EP Album, Eddie Marrero, Con Amor in 2013, a tribute album to his musical icon and The Chairman of the Board, Frank Sinatra. Sung entirely in Spanish, Eddie covers some classic hits like All The Way, All Of Me, I've Got You Under My Skin, My Way. In 2016, he followed up with his sophomore release Timeless Christmas a holiday album that has gained traction on iHeart Radio, and Spotify, among others. In 2019 he released his first music video, to The Christmas Song.

Today in addition to his acting and music career, Eddie Marrero helms ERM Entertainment, Inc., a Music and Film Corporation producing independent artists, films, and commercial projects.

He attended New York University Film School and Juilliard School of Music. In 1997 he founded the Umoja Youth Project, the award-winning youth gospel choir, and is the Founder and Producing Artistic Director of Three Lions Stage.

See also

 List of Puerto Ricans

References

External links

Official Website
Three Lions Stage Homepage
Latinheat.com

1962 births
Living people
American male film actors
American male television actors
American people of Puerto Rican descent
Hispanic and Latino American male actors
Male actors from New York City
Tisch School of the Arts alumni
Juilliard School alumni
People from East Harlem